Stonelick Township is one of the fourteen townships of Clermont County, Ohio, United States. The 2010 census reported 5,890 people living there, 5,096 of whom lived in unincorporated areas of it.

Geography
Located in the northern part of the county, Stonelick borders the townships of:
Goshen Township (to north)
Wayne Township (to northeast)
Jackson Township (to east)
Batavia Township (to south)
Union Township (to southwest)
Miami Township (to west)

The village of Owensville is in southern Stonelick Township.

Name and history
Stonelick Township was organized in 1812. It is the only Stonelick Township in Ohio.

Government
The township is governed by a three-member board of trustees, who are elected in November of odd-numbered years to a four-year term beginning on the following January 1. Two are elected in the year after the presidential election and one is elected in the year before it. There is also an elected township fiscal officer, who serves a four-year term beginning on April 1 of the year after the election, which is held in November of the year before the presidential election. Vacancies in the fiscal officership or on the board of trustees are filled by the remaining trustees.

References

External links
Township website
County website

Townships in Clermont County, Ohio